Instructables is a website specializing in user-created and uploaded do-it-yourself projects, currently owned by Autodesk. It was created by Eric Wilhelm and Saul Griffith and launched in August 2005. Instructables is dedicated to step-by-step collaboration among members to build a variety of projects. Users post instructions to their projects, usually accompanied by visual aids, and then interact through comment sections below each Instructable step as well in topic forums.

History
After graduating from the Media Lab at MIT, Wilhelm and Griffith founded Squid Labs, an engineering and technology company specializing in design and consulting. Instructables started as an internal Squid Labs project, which later spun out as an independent company with Wilhelm as its CEO. Wilhelm still regularly contributes to the site.

A prototype version of the site, complete with the initial content of electronics, cooking, kiting, and bicycle projects, was released in August 2005 at the O'Reilly Foo Camp conference.

The original content focused mostly on such projects as building electronic or mechanical devices to solve common problems around the home. The scope of the project has expanded to include a larger array of categories, including Food, Living, Outside, Tech, Play and Workshop. Sponsored categories are sometimes added for companies to advertise a specific topic on the site.

The site allows uploading of photos, diagrams, video and animation to help explain complex terminology and mechanisms in clear and understandable terms.

Instructables employs a full-time staff, and also has a volunteer group, who feature well-documented articles, welcome new users, and help out around the site.

On August 1, 2011, Autodesk announced the acquisition of Instructables.

Community
Once registered, members can create Instructables that are step-by-step descriptions of projects they want to share online. They are written in such a way that they easily allow other members to replicate, and share with the rest of the community. Members can also upload videos and slideshows, depicting a project that they have not documented.

Multiple contests are held each month, each with a unique theme. People vote for entries in a specific competition that they think are of good quality and creativity, and prizes are awarded to the winners. An Instructables-sponsored contest will usually award T-shirts, patches and stickers, but often more extravagant prizes are awarded based on sponsor availability.

A forum feature was added for members to post ideas, questions, discussions, requests for help, and all manner of other things. Later on, a dedicated question and answer system was also rolled out.

Classes were introduced in February 2017 for members to enroll and learn skills to gain confidence in a variety of trades, like woodworking, welding, electronics, Arduino, baking, 3D printing, laser cutting, and a variety of other classes, offering over 35 classes.

In the press
Instructables has been profiled in Make, The Village //ccc++// CCC//Voice CCC//, Popular Science, The Daily Telegraph, and PC World. It has also received attention from National Public Radio (NPR).

Pro membership
In June 2009, Instructables introduced a "Pro" membership account for about $2 to $4 a month. Pro memberships quickly became controversial when many of the membership features were restricted to Pro members, while some new features were made available exclusively to Pro members. Users can earn Pro membership for free for three months by getting their content featured. If the content hits the home page or wins a prize in a contest, they can get one year free Pro membership.

See also
 3D printing
 Maker culture

References

External links
 Instructables-cc+(//CVC//CCL//
 Article about Instructables from The Village Voice
 Article about Instructables from The Daily Telegraph

DIY culture
How-to websites
American educational websites
Internet properties established in 2005
Autodesk acquisitions
2011 mergers and acquisitions